VTDigger is an investigative journalism platform that reports on politics, businesses, events, and public policy of Vermont. VTDigger was founded in September 2009 by its current Executive Director, Anne Galloway, who was nominated for the "Vermonter of the Year Award" by The Burlington Free Press in 2016. In 2010, VTDigger merged with the Vermont Journalism Trust, a non-profit organization that currently publishes the site. Published by a non-profit, a substantial part of its support comes from a governmental unit(s) and/or from the general public, including sponsors, gifts, and organization membership. According to the Institute for Nonprofit News (INN), "In the second least-populous state in the country, VTDigger is averaging nearly 300,000 monthly users, has a staff of 19 full-time employees, and an annual budget over $1.5 million" as of May 2018.  VTDigger has received substantial public support from government agencies and other sources, including over $1.725 million in 2016, $1.37 million in 2017, and $941,243 in 2018 (which represents 75.850 % of total revenue in 2018).  VTDigger made only $21,816 from advertising revenue in 2018.  Executive Director, Anne Galloway, reported total compensation of $64,519 from VTDigger in 2018.

Mentions
The Institute for Nonprofit News and the Single Subject News Project at Harvard Kennedy School's Shorenstein Center on Media, Politics and Public Policy published a case study about VTDigger titled "VTDigger: A Rising Star in Nonprofit News," which details the birth and rise of VTDigger and the role of Anne Galloway in this effort.

VTDigger is often referenced in the Burlington Free Press for breaking stories, such as the report of the testimony of a former Burlington College trustee before a federal grand jury about the involvement of Sen. Bernie Sanders' wife, Dr. Jane Sanders', involvement in the sale of property while she was a president of Burlington College. The Burlington Free Press credited VTDigger for breaking the news of the testimony. VTDigger's coverage was also picked up in newspapers across the country.

A 2010 Burlington Free Press article about the ACLU's attempt to get information from a Vermont town about an alleged racial profiling incident suggests that accepting the help of the ACLU to investigate the incident may have placed the VTDigger in a conflict of interest with journalistic objectivity. The relationship between the VTDigger and ACLU on this case is mentioned again in a Burlington Free Press article about the ACLU's request to the VT Supreme Court to release the documents related to the incident.

References

External links
VTDigger Official Website

Newspapers published in Vermont
American news websites
Nonprofit newspapers